Ottelia ovalifolia, commonly known as swamp lily, is a species of aquatic plant belonging to the Hydrocharitaceae family and native to the Australian mainland. Ottelia ovalifolia has been introduced into New Zealand, Vanuatu and the Solomon Islands.

References

External links 
 Ottelia ovalifolia images & occurrence data at GBIF

ovalifolia
Monocots of Australia